Akawaio penak is a species of bluntnose knifefish native to the upper Mazaruni River, Guyana.  This species is the only known member of its genus.

References

Hypopomidae
Fish described in 2014